The State Railways Administration of Uruguay, or AFE, is the autonomous agency of the Oriental Republic of Uruguay charged with rail transport and the maintenance of Uruguayan railways.

History
On 31 December 1948, Parliament approved projects for acquiring foreign railroads, discharging part of the £17 million which was owed to Uruguay by the United Kingdom because of purchases made during World War II. On 31 January 1949, the railroads were nationalized. That August, the executive branch of government proposed to the General Assembly the creation of a body known as the Land Transport Management of the State (ATTE), charged with the following:
Manage passenger and freight transport by road
Operate and maintain the rail network
Provide services on roads built and maintained by the Ministry of Transportation

The monopoly would gradually prepare to take over private enterprises, and the proposal was based on the need to avoid ruinous competition. Having difficulty obtaining approval, the Executive decided not to pursue the proposal and allow the new entity to limit its function to the operation of rail transport. Meanwhile, between 31 January 1949 and 19 September 1952 the country held two state railways: the Ferrocarril Central del Uruguay (for nationalized companies) and the state railway and tram network, which remained at the forefront of its former operations. The two companies were merged with the creation of the State Railways Administration (AFE) on 19 September 1952.

Recent developments 
Half of the network is closed, with freight trains circulating branches from Montevideo – Rivera – Livramento; Piedra Sola – Three Trees; Sayago – Minas; Verdum – Plant ANCAP; Carnelli – La Teja; Chamberlain – Paysandú – Salto – Concordia and Algorta – Fray Bentos. The branch from August 25 – San Jose – Ombucitos is under renovation, and the stretch to San Jose was reopened for passenger service in December 2006.

Passenger service is provided by three suburban lines, starting from Montevideo to the north (to Florida, 109 km), the west (San Jose, 96 km sharing Line 63 to August 25) and the northeast (Mr. Victor Sudriers, 44 km, sharing the first 8 km with the other two). Since 1 March 2003, passenger trains depart and arrive at a new terminal 500 meters north of the Central Station in Montevideo (which has been closed); this entailed a loss of more than 100,000 passengers.
The State Railways Administration is the administrator of the rail network. It permits movement of rolling stock from other companies and institutions, and several have their own cars and locomotives (ANCAP, AUAR, CEFU, CUCP).

Rolling stock
AFE rolling stock consists of:
 5 Italian-Swedish Kalmar Verkstad/Fiat Y1 railcars. They were acquired in agreement between UTE, ANTEL, ANCAP and Banco República in 2013. Manufactured between 1979 and 1981 and reconstructed in 2002. They come from Sweden where they were in service.
Their status is as follows:
In service: 1273, 1310, 1317, 1354
Out of service:1333

10 Canadian General Electric locomotives C-18-7i-1993, numbered 2001 to 2010 (all in service)
9 General Electric locomotives
ALCO 1500 locomotives, a total of 47 locomotives which arrived in two shipments: 20 in 1952 (numbered 1501 to 1520) and 27 in 1954 (numbered from 1521 to 1547). Nine of them are still serviceable (1505, 1506, 1515, 1519, 1525, 1530, 1539, 1545, 1547) but they are in Peñarol workshops waiting to be repaired.

19 Alsthom locomotives, out of 25 acquired in 1963. Between 1988 and 1991, 15 were rebuilt with new engines at the Peñarol shop. Their status is as follows:
In service (rebuilt): 801, 803, 805, 806, 809, 810, 811, 812, 813, 816, 817, 818, 819, 820 and 824
In service (original condition): 802, 814, 822 and 825

16 Diesel-hydraulic trains from the Hungarian manufacturer Ganz-MÁVAG. One locomotive is in service and two are undergoing repair; the trains consist of a locomotive and first- and second-class cars which arrived between 1977 and 1978. The stock was neglected: vandalized, cannibalized for repairs, damaged by weather or used for commercial projects (such as a railway exhibition in 1993, when all 16 were cleared for commercial use by several companies). The status of the locomotives is:
In service: 916
Undergoing repairs: 910 and 913
Repairable: 901, 902, 903, 904, 907, 908, 909, 914 and 915
In disrepair: 905, 906, 911 and 912

Four Brill model 60 locomotives (arriving between 1934 and 1937—numbers 121, 122, 123 and 127); the remainder were scrapped
Two German VT 795 railbuses, survivors of 28 cars and 28 trailers (of two different types) bought used from German railways between 1980 and 1983
Six locomotives from three different manufacturers: General Electric Model 25-ton (numbers 201–204); Nippon Sharyo 41-ton No. 205 (in service) and General Electric 44-ton No. 409
Out of service: ALCO 1953 MRS-1 locomotive (abandoned at Peñarol); GE 44-ton locomotive numbers 402, 408 and 410

See also 
Rail transport in Uruguay

References

External links

Official website

Railway companies of Uruguay
Railway companies established in 1952
Government-owned companies of Uruguay
Government-owned railway companies
1952 establishments in Uruguay